Davor Bubanja (born 26 September 1987) is a retired Slovenian footballer who played as a forward.

External links
PrvaLiga profile 

1987 births
Living people
Sportspeople from Kranj
Slovenian footballers
Association football forwards
NK Olimpija Ljubljana (2005) players
FC Koper players
NK Triglav Kranj players
Slovenian Second League players
Slovenian PrvaLiga players
Slovenian expatriate footballers
Slovenian expatriate sportspeople in Austria
Expatriate footballers in Austria